John Fitzgerald (born April 14, 1975) is a former American football quarterback. He last played for the Kansas City Brigade of the Arena Football League. He was previously the head coach of af2's Oklahoma City Yard Dawgz where he compiled a 7-9 record in his one season
.
 
At the University of Tulsa, Fitzgerald finished as the school's second all-time passer.

Head coaching record

Notes

External links
 Wranglers QB finds success at ACC
 AFL stats

1975 births
Living people
People from Seminole, Oklahoma
American football quarterbacks
Tulsa Golden Hurricane football players
Houston ThunderBears players
Carolina Cobras players
Dallas Desperados players
New Orleans VooDoo players
Austin Wranglers players
Oklahoma City Yard Dawgz coaches
Kansas City Brigade  players